Vladimir Kozlov (Козлов Владимир Георгиевич), born 7 June 1956, is a film director and screenwriter from Belarus.

Biography
Kozlov was born in 1956 in Minsk and studied history at Belarus State University. He worked at Belarusfilm and Mosfilm as an assistant director (1978–1992), completing assistant and second unit director courses at VGIK (Moscow). Since then, he has been an actor and director in French stage theater companies, and a documentary film director in Russia and France.

Filmography
Documentaries
2002  The Music and Colours of Father Leonid
2004  The small russian sister from the Sylvanes abbey
2006  Tugan Sokhiev, crescendo subito
2006, 2008  Youri Morozov
2011 Gagarinland
2011 Alexeï Léonov, the Spacewalker
Garonne-Volga,2012

Nicolas Gresny, 2013

Feature
2008  The Tenderness
2010 Merry Christmas, Vladimir

External links
Vladimir Kozlov
 http://www.kinokultura.com/2011/32r-gagarinland.shtml
 https://www.bbc.com/news/world-europe-17707527
 http://www.cronograf.md/Filme_1360850136.php?id=116&l=en

1956 births
20th-century Belarusian people
Belarusian film directors
Belarusian State University alumni
Living people
Film people from Minsk